Prunum caledonicum is a species of sea snail, a marine gastropod mollusk in the family Marginellidae, the margin snails.

Distribution
This marine species occurs off New Caledonia.

References

 Cossignani T. (2001) Descrizione di sei nuove marginelle (Gastropoda: Prosobranchia, Marginellidae e Cystiscidae) della Nuova Caledonia. Malacologia Mostra Mondiale 35: 12-17
 Cossignani T. (2006). Marginellidae & Cystiscidae of the World. L'Informatore Piceno. 408pp.

Marginellidae
Gastropods described in 2001